Below are the squads for the 2010 East Asian Football Championship tournament in Japan. There were 23 players in each squad, including 3 goalkeepers.

Head coach:  Gao Hongbo

Coach:  Kim Pan-Gon

Manager:  Takeshi Okada

Manager:  Huh Jung-Moo

Player statistics
Player representation by club

Player representation by club league

Average age of squads

Players with most international appearance

Players with most international goals

External links
 Official website of East Asian Football Championship 2010 Final Competition by JFA
 Official website of East Asian Football Championship 2010 Final Competition by EAFF

EAFF E-1 Football Championship squads